Valmy is a commune in the Marne department in north-eastern France.

Valmy may also refer to:

People
Valmy (name)

Places
Valmy, Nevada, unincorporated community in the United States
Valmy, Wisconsin, unincorporated community in the United States

Companies 
 Valmy (company), a French manufacturer of medical supplies

Other uses
Battle of Valmy, battle of the French Revolutionary Wars
French ship Valmy (1847), French ship of the line